Clacton Airport  is located  west of the seaside town of Clacton-on-Sea, Essex, England.

Clacton Aerodrome is unlicensed

References

External links
Clacton Aero Club

Airfield